Jerome Smith may refer to:
Jerome V. C. Smith (1800–1879), American mayor of Boston, Massachusetts
Jerome Smith (musician) (1953–2000), American guitarist
Jerome Smith (American football) (born 1991), American football player
Jerry Smith (American football coach) (Jerome Anthony Smith, 1930–2011), American football player and coach